Willms is a surname. Notable people with the surname include:

André Willms (born 1972), German rower
Jesse Willms (born 1987), Canadian businessman
John Willms (1849–1914), German Roman Catholic priest
Karri Willms (born 1969), Canadian curler and coach
Robert Willms (born 1969), Canadian sculptor and teacher